Penguin News is the only newspaper produced in the Falkland Islands. It is published every Friday and provides news and features about the islands.

History 
The paper was founded as a monthly in 1979, and after the Falkland Islands War it became a fortnightly paper and then eventually a weekly paper. It was sold to fishing company Seamount Ltd in 1988 in the hopes of saving the newspaper, but after Seamount's bankruptcy the Falkland Islands Government took control of Seamount's assets, and legislation was passed for the Media Trust to guarantee the independence of the paper.

Editions from 1979 to date are published online by the Falklands Government Archives.

Uruguayan news agency MercoPress marked the 25th anniversary of the founding of Penguin News with an article which tracked the paper's interesting history.

See also
Falkland Islands Gazette The official journal of the Falkland Islands Government since 1891.
The Falkland Islands Journal is an annual academic journal covering all aspects of research on the Falkland Islands. It was established in 1967.
Falkland Islands Magazine published monthly from 1889 until 1933.

References

External links
 Penguin News

Publications with year of establishment missing
Communications in the Falkland Islands
English-language newspapers published in South America